Streptomyces resistomycificus is a bacterium species from the genus of Streptomyces which has been isolated from soil. Streptomyces resistomycificus produces the pentacyclic polyketide resistomycin.

Further reading

See also 
 List of Streptomyces species

References

External links
Type strain of Streptomyces resistomycificus at BacDive -  the Bacterial Diversity Metadatabase

resistomycificus
Bacteria described in 1952